Khorramabad (also Romanized as Khorramābād) is a village in Raqqeh Rural District, Eresk District, Boshruyeh County, South Khorasan Province, Iran. At the 2006 census, its population was 9, in 5 families.

References 

Populated places in Boshruyeh County